John Mack may refer to:
 John Martin Mack (1715–1784), Moravian bishop
 John Mack (Medal of Honor recipient) (1843–1881), American Civil War sailor and Medal of Honor recipient
 John J. Mack (coach) (1870–1923), Yale University track coach
 John Sephus Mack (1880–1940), president of the G. C. Murphy Company
 John Mack (British politician) (1899–1957), Labour Member of Parliament for Newcastle-under-Lyme 1942–1951
 John Mack (musician) (1927–2006), American oboist
 John E. Mack (1929–2004), American psychiatrist known for his interest in alien abduction
 John Givan Davis Mack (1867–1924), American engineer
 John Mack (civic leader) (1937–2018), president of the Los Angeles Urban League
 John J. Mack (born 1944), former CEO and Chairman of the Board of Morgan Stanley
 John C. Mack (born 1976), American photographer
 John L. Mack (fl. 1956–1993), American sound engineer
 John Mack (bishop), bishop of the Polish National Catholic Church
 John M. (Jack) Mack, one of the founding brothers of Mack Trucks
 John Mack (anthropologist) (born 1949), British social anthropologist and art historian
 John Mack (athletic director), director of athletics for Princeton University

See also
 Jack Mack (1881–1960), Australian rules footballer
 Johnny Mac (disambiguation)